Go go or Gogo may refer to:

Geography 
 Ghogha, India, a town once also known as Gogo
 Gogo, Boulkiemdé, Burkina Faso, a town
 Gogo, Zoundwéogo, Burkina Faso, a city
 Gogo Department, a department in central Burkina Faso
 Gogo Formation, a fossil reef formation in Western Australia
 Gogo Station, a pastoral lease in the Kimberley of Western Australia

Science 
 Gogo (fish), a genus of Anchariid catfish
 Gogo Fish (disambiguation), two species of fish fossils found in the Gogo Formation in Western Australia

Arts and entertainment

Fictional characters 
 Gogo (Final Fantasy), from the Super Nintendo role-playing games Final Fantasy V and VI
 Ebu Gogo, creatures in the mythology of the people of the island of Flores, Indonesia
 Estragon, or Gogo, from Samuel Beckett's Waiting for Godot
 Gogo Dodo, from Tiny Toon Adventures
 Gogo Germain, from the film St. Louis Blues (1958)
 GoGo Tomago, from Big Hero 6
 Gogo Yubari, from Kill Bill: Volume 1

Games and toys
 Gogo's Crazy Bones, or simply Gogo's, a children's game and toy
 Go Go Pets, former name of ZhuZhu Pets,  American line of toys

Music 
 Go-go, a form of funk music that arose in the 1970s
 Gogo (Quebec music), a type of Quebec dance music of the 1960s
 The Go-Go's, a 1980s American all female rock band
 The Go-Go's (British band), a 1960s British band
 GO!GO!7188 or Gogo, a Japanese indie-rock band
 Gogo (Canadian musician), keyboardist for the rock band Trooper
 "Go-Go" (Alphabeat song)
 "Go Go", a song from the 1996 album Coolin' Off by the band Galactic
"Go Go", a song from the 2000 album Bridging the Gap by the Black Eyed Peas
 GoGo Penguin, British jazz-electronica band from Manchester
 "고민보다 Go" (Go Go), a song by South Korean boy band BTS from the 2017 EP Love Yourself: Her

People 
 Gogo (mayor of the palace), 6th-century Frankish mayor of the palace of Austrasia
 Gogo people or Wagogo, a Bantu ethnic group in central Tanzania

Other uses 
 Gogo language, a Bantu language spoken by the Gogo people
 Gogo, a name for a hair tie
 Gogo Inflight Internet, a commercial in-flight broadband internet service
 Gogo Business Aviation, a division of Gogo Inflight Internet
 Capital City Go-Go, a basketball team in the NBA G League

See also
 Go-go dancing, a form of nightclub entertainment
 À gogo (disambiguation)
 Goggomobil, a former German car maker
 Angelica Gogos (born 1989), Australian rules footballer playing in the AFL Women's competition
 Gogogogo, a rural municipality in Madagascar